is a maze chase video game produced by Universal and released for arcades in 1981. Its gameplay is similar to Pac-Man, with the primary addition to the formula being gates that change the layout of the maze when used, adding an element of strategy to the genre. The arcade original was relatively obscure, but the game found wider recognition and success as a launch title for the ColecoVision console.

Gameplay

The goal of Lady Bug is to eat all "flowers," hearts, and letters in the maze while avoiding other insects.  The player is represented by a red, yellow, and green character resembling a ladybug while the enemy insects' appearance varies by level.  The border of the maze acts as timer, with each circuit signaling the release of an enemy insect from the central area, up to (generally) a maximum of four.  The speed of the circuit increases on stages 2 and 5.

There are eight different enemy insects — a different insect is introduced on each of the first eight levels. Beginning on level 9, each level has four different enemies.

Unlike Pac-Man, the player can alter the layout of the maze by shifting any of the twenty green gates.  It is not possible to completely isolate a portion of the maze through gate-shifting.

When the fourth enemy insect enters the maze, the central area will show a level-specific vegetable. Eating a vegetable gives the player bonus points and immobilizes the enemy insects for several seconds, though touching them is still lethal. The randomly placed skull icons are lethal to ladybugs and enemy insects. An enemy insect who dies returns to the central area. Once a vegetable is eaten, the central area will remain empty unless an enemy insect dies and is re-released, revealing a new vegetable. A ladybug who dies will shrink from view and be briefly replaced with icons resembling the stereotypical wings and halo of an angel.

The colors of the hearts and letters cycle through a short red, a middling yellow, and a longer blue. The point values are as follows:

Flower: 10 points (20, 30, or 50 points with appropriate multiplier)
Blue letter/heart: 100 points (200, 300, or 500 points with appropriate multiplier)
Yellow letter/heart: 300 points (600, 900, or 1500 points with appropriate multiplier)
Red letter/heart: 800 points (1600, 2400, or 4000 points with appropriate multiplier)
Vegetable: Starts at 1000 points, increases by 500 with each level to a maximum of 9500 points on level 18. Beyond this level, the vegetable's appearance (horseradish) and point value remain fixed.

If a heart is consumed while it is blue, a point multiplier will come into effect, indicated by the blue section in the upper right corner of the screen. The first blue heart doubles all point values, the second triples them and the third quintuples them. This multiplier lasts until the level is complete.  Eating hearts while they are yellow or red offers no benefit beyond the points collected.

At each level, the maze will contain three letters. The first will be randomly selected from the set of {X, T, R} (which appear only in EXTRA), the second will be randomly selected from the set of {S, P, C, I, L} (which appear only in SPECIAL),  and the third will be an A or an E (which appear in both words). A secondary goal of the player is to complete the words SPECIAL (indicated in red in the top left corner) and EXTRA (in yellow at top center).  If, for example, a letter S is consumed while it is red, the corresponding letter in the word SPECIAL will change from grey to red.  Eating an S while it is any other color (or if the S in SPECIAL is already red) offers no benefit beyond the points collected. Completing the word SPECIAL rewards the player with a free game, while completing EXTRA gives the player an extra life.  Completing either word causes all its letters to return to normal and immediately advances the player to the next level.

The vegetables associated with the first 18 levels and their corresponding point values are: 1 - cucumber (1000), 2 - eggplant (1500), 3 - carrot (2000), 4 - radish (2500), 5 - parsley (3000), 6 - tomato (3500), 7 - pumpkin (4000), 8 - bamboo shoot (4500), 9 - Japanese radish (5000), 10 - mushroom (5500), 11 - potato (6000), 12 - onion (6500), 13 - Chinese cabbage (7000), 14 - turnip (7500), 15 - red peper (8000) [note that the name is misspelled in the game], 16 - celery (8500), 17 - sweet potato (9000), 18 - horseradish (9500).

The melodies that play when a new Lady Bug enters the maze, and when the player is awarded an extra Lady Bug, are snippets of a Japanese pop song called "Ladybug Samba" (てんとう虫のサンバ, Tentōmushi no Sanba).

Ports
Lady Bug was adapted to the home video game systems Intellivision and ColecoVision. In the ColecoVision version, completing SPECIAL puts the player into a bonus level (known in-game as a "Vegetable Harvest") where the goal is to consume as many randomly placed vegetables as possible within a fixed time. The SPECIAL register does not appear in the Intellivision version. In 1982, a catalog of Atari 2600 cartridges manufactured by Coleco said that an Atari 2600 version of Lady Bug would be released, but Coleco never released the game.
Lady Bug was also released as "Fighting Bug" on the Casio PV-1000 in Japan, one of only 13 games released for that platform.

Reception
According to Electronic Games. Lady Bug did "just all right in the arcades" but became popular when it was released as a home video game cartridge. They said the ColecoVision port is "proving to be one of the most successful home videogames ever."

The arcade game was recognized for its originality within the maze game genre. In January 1983, the fourth Arcade Awards gave it a Certificate of Merit as runner-up for Most Innovative Coin-Op Game, stating that the "addition of turnstiles to the labyrinth" made the game "a fascinating contest packed with strategic nuances never before equalled in this particular genre of coin-op." Electronic Games called it "the most wonderful blend of strategy and maze-chase thrills ever concocted."

Reviewing the ColecoVision version, Creative Computing Video & Arcade Games said in 1983 that Lady Bug was not a Pac-Man clone, stating that the movable turnstiles "set it apart from all other maze games". The magazine reported that the ColecoVision version had become more popular than the arcade game at its office. It was reviewed in Video magazine in its "Arcade Alley" column where it was described as "a maze-chase game with all the high-speed action and thrills of Pac-Man combined with strategy-oriented play and pinball-style bonus features". The game's sound and graphics were reported to "equal, if not actually surpass, the original", and the reviewers particularly emphasized the innovative use of "color sequencing and the revolving turnstiles". The most significant criticism offered was that "the movement control is stiff and somewhat jerky". This version of the game was popular, winning the Videogame of the Year award in the "16K or more ROM" category at the 5th annual Arkie Awards where the judges described it as an "outstanding home edition of a coin-op-palace cult favorite". The game has received appreciation in later years, being praised by some as "the most challenging of the Pac-clones... It was, and still is, one of the best [of the clones]."

Legacy

Doodle Bug is a 1982 clone for the TRS-80 Color Computer. Bumble Bee replaces the main character with a bumblebee and the enemies with spiders; it was released in 1983 and 1984 by Micro Power for the BBC Micro, Acorn Electron, and Commodore 64.

See also
Mouse Trap (1981)
Drelbs (1983)

Notes

References

External links

Classic Gaming Game of the Week article

1981 video games
Arcade video games
ColecoVision games
Intellivision games
Pac-Man clones
Video games about insects
Video games developed in Japan
Video games featuring female protagonists
Universal Entertainment games
Multiplayer and single-player video games